Rastina is a village located in the Sombor municipality, in the West Bačka District, Vojvodina province in northern Serbia, at the border with Hungary. The village has a Serb ethnic majority and a population of 410 people (2011 census).

Name
In Serbian, the village is known as Rastina (Растина), in Croatian as Rastina, and in Hungarian as Haraszti or Rasztina.

History

It was first mentioned in the 14th century as Harasti during the administration of the Kingdom of Hungary. During Ottoman rule (16th-17th century), Rastina was populated by ethnic Serbs. In the first half of the 19th century, it was a possession of Baron Redl. In the second half of the 19th century, Rastina was not regarded as separate settlement, but as part of Stanišić, while until the end of the Second World War, it was regarded as part of Riđica. It was officially proclaimed a separate settlement after World War II. After World War I, Rastina was settled by volunteers from Lika and Herzegovina.

Demographics

Historical population
Population of the village in history:

1948: 905
1953: 939
1961: 960
1971: 892
1981: 686
1991: 605
2002: 566
2011: 410

Ethnic groups (2002)
Serbs: 543 (95,93%)
Others: 23

See also
List of places in Serbia
List of cities, towns and villages in Vojvodina

References

External links 

Rastina @ SOinfo.org
Castle of Redl Lajos, Rastina

Places in Bačka
Sombor
West Bačka District